Alla Sidorovskaya (born Rogova, 27 July 1983) is a former Russian footballer. She played as a midfielder for Izmailovo Moscow and the Russia national team.

Club career
She played for Izmailovo Moscow since 2007.

International career
She took part in UEFA Women's Euro 2009. She was called up to be part of the national team for the UEFA Women's Euro 2013.

Personal life
Sidorovskaya was born in Moscow. She played in the national team under the surname Rogova before her marriage. She suspended the career for two years due to maternity leave.

Honours
Izmailovo Moscow
Runner-up
 Russian Women's Cup: 2013

References

External links
 
 
 
 Profile at soccerdonna.de 

1983 births
Living people
Russian women's footballers
Footballers from Moscow
Russia women's international footballers
CSP Izmailovo players
Women's association football midfielders
Russian Women's Football Championship players